The 2017 Erovnuli Liga 2 (formerly known as Pirveli Liga) was the 29th season of second tier football in Georgia. The season began on 4 March 2017 and ended on 25 November 2017.

Teams and stadiums 

Source:

League table

Relegation play-offs 

Telavi won 3–2 on aggregate.

Norchi Dinamoeli won 6–0 on aggregate.

References

External links
  
Georgian Football Federation

Erovnuli Liga 2 seasons
2
Georgia
Georgia